Brayan Andrés Rovira Ferreira (born 2 December 1996) is a Colombian professional footballer who plays as midfielder for Universidad Católica.

Honours

Club 
Atlético Nacional
 Categoría Primera A (2): 2014 Apertura, 2015 Finalización
 Superliga Colombiana (1): 2016

External links 
 

1996 births
Living people
Colombian footballers
Colombian expatriate footballers
Colombia youth international footballers
Colombia under-20 international footballers
Categoría Primera A players
Atlético Nacional footballers
Envigado F.C. players
Atlético Bucaramanga footballers
Club Deportivo Universidad Católica footballers
Chilean Primera División players
Expatriate footballers in Chile
People from Cesar Department
Association football midfielders